Wilhelm Adam (28 March 1893 – 24 November 1978) was an officer in the Wehrmacht of Nazi Germany during World War II. Following the German surrender after the Battle of Stalingrad, he became a member of the National Committee for a Free Germany. Adam later served in the National People's Army of East Germany.

World War II

Born in 1893, Adam attended from 1908 to 1913 the teacher training college in Schlüchtern. From October 1913 to January 1919 Adam served in the Imperial German Army. He saw action during World War I and reached the rank of Lieutenant. Adam and his wife had two children, a daughter and a son. His son was killed in France at the start of World War II on 16 May 1940.

In 1939 Adam was appointed an adjutant in the XXIII Army Corps, under the Army Commanders Walther von Reichenau and later in 1941, Friedrich Paulus. On 17 December 1942, he was awarded the Knight's Cross of the Iron Cross. On 31 January 1943, now a colonel, Adam was captured by the Soviet Army after the surrender at Stalingrad, where he was interrogated by Nikolay Dyatlenko.  While a prisoner of war, he went to the Central Anti-Fascist School at Krasnogorsk and became a member of the National Committee for a Free Germany. He was also sentenced to death in absentia by a Nazi German court.

Concerning the war, Adam states, "That the Second World War started by Hitler's Germany was a crime not only against the peoples attacked by us, but also against the German nation, did not occur to us. And because of this, we did not recognize the deeper reasons for the defeat on the Volga, superiority of the socialist state and social system, whose sharp sword was the Soviet army."

Post-war period

In 1948, Adam returned to the Soviet Zone of Germany. He was among the co-founders of the National Democratic Party of Germany, an East German political party that acted as an organization for former members of the Nazi Party and the Wehrmacht. From 1948 to 1949 he worked as a consultant for the Saxony state government. From 1950 to 1952 he was Saxony's finance minister and from 1949 to 1963 a member of East Germany's Volkskammer.

In 1952, Adam became a colonel in the Kasernierte Volkspolizei (KVP) ("Barracked People's Police"), the forerunner of the East German National People's Army. From 1953 to 1956 he was commander of the Officers' College of the KVP – and later became the National People's Army. In 1958, Adam was sent into retirement. He kept on working, though, for the Working Group of Former Officers. In 1968 he was decorated with the Banner of Labor, and on the occasion of the twenty-eighth anniversary of East Germany's founding on 7 October 1977, he was appointed major general, retired in the East German Army.

Adam died on 24 November 1978 in Dresden.

Awards

 Iron Cross (1914)  2nd Class (6 September 1914) & 1st Class (30 September 1917)
 Clasp to the Iron Cross (1939)  2nd Class (26 May 1940) & 1st Class (10 October 1941)
 Wehrmacht Long Service Award, 3rd class (2 October 1936)
 Knight's Cross of the Iron Cross on 17 December 1942 as Oberst and adjutant of Armeeoberkommando 6 (Supreme Command of the 6th Army)

Works
   Adam, Wilhelm. Der schwere Entschluss, (autobiography), Berlin, 1965.
   Adam, W. with Otto Ruhle. With Paulus At Stalingrad, "Pen & Sword Books Ltd.", England, 2015.

References

Citations

Bibliography

 
 

1893 births
1978 deaths
People from Main-Kinzig-Kreis
People from Hesse-Nassau
German People's Party politicians
National Democratic Party of Germany (East Germany) politicians
Members of the Provisional Volkskammer
Members of the 1st Volkskammer
Members of the 2nd Volkskammer
Members of the 3rd Volkskammer
National Committee for a Free Germany members
Major generals of the National People's Army (Ground Forces)
Recipients of the Knight's Cross of the Iron Cross
Recipients of the Patriotic Order of Merit (honor clasp)
Recipients of the Banner of Labor